Claude Pichois was a French academic and a leading scholar on the life and work of Charles Baudelaire. He was born in Paris and studied at the Ecole des Hautes Etudes Commerciales and at Sorbonne University. He taught at Vanderbilt University for many years. 

He published extensively on Baudelaire and collaborated with scholars such as Jacques Crepet and Jean Ziegler (writer). He also wrote on classic French authors such as Gerard Nerval and Colette. His life of Colette (co-written with Alain Brunet) won a Prix Goncourt.

References

French writers
2004 deaths
1925 births
HEC Paris alumni
Paris-Sorbonne University alumni
Vanderbilt University faculty